Killman or Kilman may refer to:
 Killman Zoo, located in Haldimand County, Ontario, Canada

People with the surname
 Bill Thomas Killman or Dennis Rader (born 1945), American serial killer
 Gustaf Kilman (1882–1946), Swedish Army officer and horse rider
 Mary Killman (born 1991), American synchronized swimmer
 Max Kilman (born 1997), English footballer
 Sato Kilman (born 1957), Vanuatuan politician

Characters
 Amanda Killman, a character in the American animated TV series Bunsen Is a Beast

See also
 Lorenzo Kihlman